Thabo Mboyi (born 17 May 1985) is a Zimbabwean first-class cricketer who plays for Matabeleland Tuskers. In December 2020, he was selected to play for the Tuskers in the 2020–21 Logan Cup.

References

External links
 

1985 births
Living people
Zimbabwean cricketers
Matabeleland Tuskers cricketers
Sportspeople from Bulawayo